The 2018 Argentine Republic motorcycle Grand Prix was the second round of the 2018 MotoGP season. It was held at the Autódromo Termas de Río Hondo in Santiago del Estero on 8 April 2018. In the MotoGP class, Jack Miller scored his first MotoGP pole position. The race started on wet tyres, and drivers were obliged to swap bikes to slick tyres mid-race in the flag-to-flag rule. Cal Crutchlow took Honda's 750th victory and became the first non-factory rider to lead the championship since Sete Gibernau in the 2004 Catalan Grand Prix, as well as the first British rider to lead the championship since Barry Sheene in 1979. Repsol Honda failed to score for the first time since the previous year's event. Marc Márquez and Valentino Rossi collided in the closing stages, with Márquez receiving a 30-second time penalty for his incident with Rossi after the race.

Classification

MotoGP

Moto2

Moto3

Championship standings after the race

MotoGP

Moto2

Moto3

Notes

References

Argentine
Motorcycle Grand Prix
Argentine Republic motorcycle Grand Prix
Argentine